Mission Valley Center station is a station on San Diego Trolley's Green Line and Special Event Service Line. The street-level station has side platforms. It is located near Camino De La Reina between Mission Center Road and Camino Del Este. The station is located next to the Westfield Mission Valley mall and serves a massive commercial corridor in the Mission Valley East neighborhood.

Prior to July 2005, this station was served by the Blue Line until service between Old Town Transit Center and Mission San Diego was replaced by the Green Line upon its introduction in conjunction with the opening of the Mission Valley East extension.

Station layout
There are two tracks, each served by a side platform.

See also
 List of San Diego Trolley stations

References

Green Line (San Diego Trolley)
San Diego Trolley stations in San Diego
Mission Valley, San Diego
Railway stations in the United States opened in 1997
1997 establishments in California